The United States occupation of Cuba may refer to:

 the United States Military Government in Cuba (1898–1902)
 the Second Occupation of Cuba (1906–1909)
 the Sugar Intervention (1917–1922), a third occupation of Cuba
 the continuing American presence at Guantanamo Bay Naval Base